Ishq Ibadat is a 2012 Pakistani drama serial broadcast by Geo TV. It is written by Muhammad Asif.

Cast 
 Javed Sheikh
 Faisal Qureshi
 Moammar Rana
 Mahnoor Baloch
 Natasha Ali
 Fatima Effendi
 Mariam Khan

References

External links 
 Official Website

Pakistani drama television series
Geo TV original programming
Urdu-language television shows